This list of fossil arthropods described in 2016 is a list of new taxa of trilobites, fossil insects, crustaceans, arachnids and other fossil arthropods of every kind that have been described during the year 2016, as well as other significant discoveries and events related to arthropod paleontology that occurred in the year 2016.

Arachnids

Research
 A study on the phylogenetic relationships of the Eocene tick Ixodes succineus is published by Dunlop et al. (2016).
 A study on the phylogenetic relationships of the Carboniferous species Archaeometa nephilina and Arachnometa tuberculata is published by Selden, Dunlop & Garwood (2016), who interpret these taxa as harvestmen rather than spiders.

New taxa

Crustaceans

Research
 Mesoprosopon triasinum is reinterpreted as a eumalacostracan larva by Hyžný, Haug & Haug (2016).
 A study on the phylogenetic relationships of members of the genus Tealliocaris is published by Jones et al. (2016).
 A study on the phylogenetic relationships of Antrimpos speciosus, indicating it was closely related to shrimps belonging to the genera Farfantepenaeus, Litopenaeus, Fenneropenaeus, Penaeus, Marsupenaeus and Melicertus, is published by Robalino et al. (2016).
 A study on the shapes and sizes of eyes and ommatidia of Jurassic polychelidans is published by Audo et al. (2016).
 New anatomical data on Hesslandona ventrospinata and Hesslandona angustata is published by Eriksson et al. (2016).
 Early Miocene harpacticoid copepods belonging to five families (Canthocamptidae, Cletodidae, Darcythompsoniidae, Ectinosomatidae and Laophontidae) are described from Chiapas amber (Mexico) by Huys et al. (2016).
 Fossil ephippia of members of the daphniid genus Ceriodaphnia are described from the Early Cretaceous (Aptian) Koonwarra Fossil Bed (Strzelecki Group; Victoria, Australia) by Hegna & Kotov (2016).

New taxa

Malacostracans

Ostracods

Other crustaceans

Insects

Trilobites

Research
 Queues of the trilobite Trimerocephalus chopini are described from the Devonian (Famennian) of Poland by Błażejowski et al. (2016), who interpret these queues as representing mass migratory chains.
 Disarticulated exoskeletons of the phacopids belonging to the species Omegops cornelius preserved within a nautiloid conch are described from the Devonian Hongguleleng Formation (China) by Zong, Fan & Gong (2016), who interpret the fossils as indicating that the trilobites had moulted within the living chamber of a dead nautiloid.

New taxa

Other arthropods

Research
 A description of the ventral nerve cord in the early Cambrian euarthropod Chengjiangocaris kunmingensis is published by Yang et al. (2016).
 A three-dimensionally preserved larva of Leanchoilia illecebrosa is described by Liu et al. (2016).
 A study of the eye anatomy of the thylacocephalan (an arthropod of uncertain phylogenetic placement, possibly crustacean) Dollocaris is published by Vannier et al. (2016).
 A study on the ability of bradoriid arthropods to close the shields of their carapace is published by Betts, Brock & Paterson (2016).
 A study on the morphology of the digestive system and taphonomy of a variety of specimens of the Cambrian arthropod Campanamuta mantonae, known from the Sirius Passet Lagerstätte (Greenland), is published by Strang, Armstrong & Harper (2016).

New taxa

References

2016 in paleontology
2016 in science